The Ladies of Mandrigyn is a fantasy novel by Barbara Hambly published in 1984.

Plot summary
The Ladies of Mandrigyn is a novel in which a female resistance trains to fight for their occupied territory against an evil sorcerer.

Reception
Dave Langford reviewed The Ladies of Mandrigyn for White Dwarf #86, and stated that "Add unpleasant magical gimmicks and well-drawn characters, and the result is a ripping fantasy yarn."

Reviews
Review by Faren Miller (1984) in Locus, #279 April 1984
Review by Richard Law (1984) in Fantasy Review, September 1984
Review by C. J. Henderson (1984) in Whispers #21-22, December 1984
Review by Ken Brown (1987) in Interzone, #19 Spring 1987

References

1984 American novels
1984 fantasy novels